Tambourelli is a court game invented in Galloway in Scotland in the 1970s. It has since spread all over the world, with small communities of players running active clubs in England, Scotland, Germany, Japan and Sweden. It shares many players, coaches and fans with Tamburello as well as Tambeach.

The fundamental aim is for players to stop the shuttlecock from landing within the court on their side of the net. Players hit the shuttlecock with a bat similar to a tambour (like a tambourine without bells) or Irish bodhrán which has a strap along the outer edge and a section of moulded plastic on the inner edge, both for grip.

The game can be played either outdoors or indoors.

There is an annual World Tambourelli Championship, as well as numerous Open Tournaments throughout the year such as in Dresden every September or Hamburg every January.

Rules 

The aim of the game is to have the shuttlecock land within the court on your opponent's side of the net, or to force them to make an error such as hitting the shuttlecock into the net or outside of the court.

Tournament matches are typically played in sets of three games. Each game is played until one player reaches 21 points and is 2 points clear, a point being scored for each shot that one’s opponent fails to legally return, regardless of who served. Each player serves 5 times before switching, with the first player to serve being decided by playing a point before scoring begins.

Service is underarm (beneath the shoulder) and must be taken with one foot on the court's back line. If the first service is called "out" or fails to cross the net, a second service is awarded. In singles, a player may serve to anywhere on their opponent's side of the court. In doubles, service is to the player diagonally opposite and must fall within their half of the court. A "net service" (one which clips the net on the way over but still lands "in" or which the receiving player returns) is replayed without penalty.

When a player has served for 5 points, service changes to the opposing player or team. In doubles, service passes diagonally until all players have served for 5 scored points, at which point service resumes with the first player who served and the two opposing team members swap places, so that each server now serves to a new recipient.

If the shuttlecock hits any part of the player's body, that player loses the point. Players are only allowed to hit the shuttlecock once to get it onto the opponent's side. The exception to this is the "Point Save" rule, which applies only in Doubles games. This rule allows a team to hit the shuttlecock twice to return it; however if that team goes on to win the rally they do not gain a point (they merely "save" or rescue the point). Should the opposing team also double-hit in the same rally, the two "point saves" cancel each other out and whichever team prevails in the rally wins the point. Should one team double-hit a second time in the rally when they are already one "point save" down, they lose the point (i.e. they do not "save" it).

Different clubs use slightly different court sizes, with the hosts of any given tournament permitted to choose the court size for that event, but the standard court is 9.45m long by 4.1m wide. It is split in half lengthways by a line and widthways by a net, at a height of 1.75m, with each player (in singles) or team (in doubles) always remaining on their side of the net.

World Tambourelli Championships 

There is an annual World Tambourelli Championship, which originally took place exclusively in Dumfries and Galloway in Southwest Scotland. During the 1990s tournaments were relocated to Southwest England, near Totnes in Devon, and currently move between Devon, Southwest Scotland, and Germany. Sweden and Japan aim to host the event for the first time in their respective countries in the next few years. The event currently includes a Men's Singles tournament, a Women's Singles tournament, a Mixed Doubles tournament, and Junior Singles and Doubles tournaments.

Since 2002 separate Men's Singles and Women's Singles competitions have been held. From 1991 to 2001 only an 'open' category was held that anybody could enter. For the purposes of historical record, the champions of the 1991-2001 era are referred to here as Men's Singles champions, as no woman ever won the open category (although Indy Priestman came close, reaching the final in 2001). Before 1991 there was generally also separate Men's and Women's Singles though the main emphasis in the tournaments was on the Mixed Doubles competition.

The format of the tournament can vary depending on the number of participants and the availability of time and space, as well as the preferences of the hosts. Usually there is a round-robin group stage in which a single game to 21 is played, followed by a knockout stage of 4, 8 or 16 participants where each match is best-of-3.

The groups are usually decided upon by randomly allocating 1 of the highest ranked participants to each group, then randomly assigning the remainder of the participants among the groups evenly. However the seeding system has only existed since 2011, and the method by which rankings are calculated is still the source of much debate.

In the Mixed Doubles category pairings have traditionally been decided by drawing names out of a hat. Where seeded players are drawn together those names are placed back in and redrawn, the aim being to allow for no team to be excessively dominant and for the random pairing of experienced and inexperienced players or those of differing ability in the same competition. At some tournaments Doubles pairs are pre-chosen. This is generally the case in Germany where separate Men's Doubles, Women's Doubles and a Mixed Doubles competitions have been held.

Typically there are children's tournaments that take place at the same place and time. However, these vary from year to year in several ways: sometimes (usually in Devon) there is simply an under-14s singles and doubles tournament, sometimes there are multiple age groups and separate boys/girls tournaments, and sometimes the Under 16s World Tambourelli Championships take place at a different date and entirely different venue to the World Tambourelli Championship, such as in 2008 when the main WTC took place on Riverford Farm in Devon but the Under 16s tournament took place in Newton Stewart in Scotland.

Results

Men's Singles World Champions By Year

Women's Singles World Champions By Year

Mixed Doubles World Champions By Year

† Denotes years in which doubles pairs were not randomly assigned

Men's Singles World Champions By Number of Titles

Women's Singles World Champions By Number of Titles

Multiple-Time Doubles World Champions By Number of Titles

Full Results By Year

2022

Men's Singles

Women's Singles

Mixed Doubles

The mixed doubles was won by Alexander Christen and Kyou Colquitt

2018

The 2018 World Tambourelli Championship, hosted by Scottish Tambourelli, took place on the 28th and 29th of July at the Merrick Leisure Centre in Newton Stewart, Scotland.

The Men's Singles was won by Sebastian Rose. The Women's Singles was won by Jasmine Bosenick. The Mixed Doubles was won by Graham Moffat and Jason Littlefield.

Men's Singles

Sebastian Rose defeated Bazil Hughes in 2 games in the men's singles final, completing a perfect tournament with no games dropped. This feat has only been performed once before in men's singles, by Liam Campbell in 2010. The final was also the first match in which Bazil Hughes lost in 2 straight games since the same tournament in 2010 against Liam Campbell. With victory Sebastian Rose became the first ever multiple-time men's singles champion from outside the UK, and continued his streak of never having lost a singles match on Scottish soil.

Women's Singles

Jasmine Bosenick won her third World Tambourelli Championship title, winning every game on her way to a convincing victory. This was her third successive victory including only tournaments in which she was participating.

Mixed Doubles

The Mixed Doubles was won by Graham Moffat and Jason Littlefield, who defeated Indy Lennartsson and Lutz Reiter 11-21, 21-9, 21-13.

Veterans (over 50s) Doubles

The Veterans Doubles was won by Elizabeth Tindal and Hugh Wallis, who defeated Chloe Bruce and Nik Clark.

2017

The 2017 World Tambourelli Championship, hosted by the Devon Tambourelli Association, took place on the 5th and 6 August on Riverford farm near Totnes in Devon.

The Men's Singles was won by Bazil Hughes. The Women's Singles was won by Katrin Ueberfuhr. The Mixed Doubles was won by Chloe Bruce and Ringo Sobiella. The Luscombe Cup (for children 13 and under) Singles was won by Haruka Takamura. The Luscombe Cup Doubles was won by Nuno Priestman and Noi Priestman.

Men's Singles

Bazil Hughes defeated Marco Zink in 3 games in the Men's Singles final, in a repeat of the previous year's final (which Marco Zink won). The tournament marked the first time that any German player has reached the semi-finals in an outdoor event, with 3 German players making it to the last 4. It is also the first time ever (according to the available records) that the same 2 players have reached the final 2 years in a row. With this win Bazil Hughes claimed his 4th title, taking him to 2nd on the all-time list (after Malcolm Heyes on 7, although it is believed that Andy Priestman has more victories than his official tally of 3).

Women's Singles

Katrin Ueberfuhr won her first World Tambourelli Championship title, coming out of her group in 2nd place but adjusting to the conditions and winning her semi-final and final matches in impressive fashion.

Mixed Doubles

Ringo Sobiella & Chloe Bruce won the Mixed Doubles tournament, defeating Taliesen Appleton-Wickens & Nik Clark in the final 2 games to 1.

Under 14 Singles

Haruka Takamura won the Luscombe Cup Singles, defeating Nuno Priestman in the final.

Under 14 Doubles

Nuno Priestman and Noi Priestman won the Luscombe Cup Doubles.

Veterans (over 50s) Doubles

The Veterans Doubles was won by Nick Clarke and Hugh Wallis, who defeated Chloe Bruce and Taro Shiokawa.

2016

The 2016 World Tambourelli Championship, hosted by Tamburello Dresden, took place on the 27th and 28 August in Dresden.

The Men's Singles was won by Marco Zink. The Women's Singles was won by Amke de Buhr.

Men's Singles

Marco Zink defeated Bazil Hughes 11-10 in the third-set tie-breaker to clinch his first World Tambourelli Championship title in dramatic fashion. Marco Zink was the second successive German Men's Singles champion, after Sebastian Rose took home the title the previous year.

Women's Singles

Amke de Buhr beat Inga Höben in the final to claim her first titles, and become the first German Women's Singles champion.

Mixed Doubles
The Mixed Doubles was won by Dominic Hauke & Nadine Harmatschek, who defeated Bazil Hughes & Chloe Bruce in the final in 3 games. In this tournament, the pairs were not randomly drawn as is usually the case but chosen in advance.

2015

The 2015 World Tambourelli Championship, hosted by Scottish Tambourelli, took place on the 22nd and 23 August at the Merrick Leisure Centre in Newton Stewart, Scotland.

The Men's Singles was won by Sebastian Rose. The Women's Singles was won by Jasmine Bosenick. The Mixed Doubles was won by Taliesen Appleton-Wickens and Bazil Hughes.

Men's Singles

Sebastian Rose defeated Marco Zink in 2 games in the Men's Singles final. Sebastian Rose was not only the first German champion (and along with Marco Zink the first German finalist), but also the first Men's Singles champion from outside the UK. This ended a streak of 5 consecutive Scottish champions, and announced Tamburello Dresden as the new top dogs of the competitive scene.

Women's Singles

Jasmine Bosenick defeated Gabriele Rose in the final, winning her 2nd (and 2nd consecutive) World Tambourelli Championship title. With this win she became the 3rd player (after Rosey Priestman and Indy Priestman) to win the title more than once.

{{Round4

||   Gabriele Rose                             |       ''Chloe Bruce       |             |
||                                |       Morag Paterson     |  Jasmine Bosenick              | 2||   Gabriele Rose                         |         |  Jasmine Bosenick                    | 2}}Mixed DoublesTaliesen Appleton-Wickens & Bazil Hughes won the Mixed Doubles tournament, defeating Marco Zink & Kevin Witt in the final.Veterans (over 50s) DoublesThe Veterans Doubles was won by Nick Wright and Nik Clark, who defeated Chloe Bruce and Hugh Wallis.

2014

The 2014 World Tambourelli Championship, hosted by the Devon Tambourelli Association, took place on the 2nd and 3 August on Riverford farm near Totnes in Devon.

The Men's Singles was won by Bazil Hughes. The Women's Singles was won by Jasmine Bosenick. The Mixed Doubles was won by Silver Levy-So and Tom Amey.Men's SinglesBazil Hughes defeated Finn Lennartsson in 2 games in the Men's Singles final for his 3rd world title. Finn Lennartsson's run was one of the most memorable in Tambourelli history: he came through a razor-tight tie-breaker against Jason Littlefield to escape his group, defeated one of the favorites and Tambourelli greats Malcolm Heyes 2-1 in his quarter final, and defeated another former champion and favorite Daniel Francis-Bernson 2-1 in his semi-final.

However the fairytale run came to an end in the final, played late at night in brutally cold conditions, when the defending champion Bazil Hughes wrapped up a dominant tournament with a decisive 2-0 victory. With this victory Bazil Hughes became the first player since Malcolm Heyes in 2006 to defend his Men's Singles title.Women's SinglesJasmine Bosenick won her first World Tambourelli Championship title, ending perhaps the most impressive streak in competitive tambourelli history by becoming the first female player to defeat Indy Lennartsson (née Priestman) in recorded history. She also became the first ever English Women's Singles champion, after 12 consecutive Scottish champions since the Women's Singles tournament restarted in 2002.Mixed DoublesSilver Levy-So & Tom Amey won the Mixed Doubles tournament, defeating Daniel Francis-Bernson & Finlay
Porter in the final.

2013

The 2013 World Tambourelli Championship, hosted by Tamburello Dresden, took place on the 20th and 21 July in Dresden, Germany. It was the first World Tambourelli Championship to take place outside the UK.

The Men's Singles was won by Bazil Hughes. The Women's Singles was won by Indy Priestman. Unlike in previous years, there was no Mixed Doubles tournament with randomly-assigned pairs but instead Men's Doubles and Women's Doubles tournaments in which players chose their doubles partners in advance. The Men's Doubles was won by Phillip Bahner & David Sobiella. The Women's Doubles was won by Indy Priestman & Chloe Bruce.Men's SinglesBazil Hughes defeated Malcolm Heyes in 2 games in the Men's Singles final, winning back the title that Malcolm Heyes won from him in 2012. In the final, Malcolm Heyes started strongly and reached the brink of victory in the first game with a lead of 19 points to 15. However, while leaping forward to win his 19th point, he suffered from cramp in his calf. After a short break he was able to continue, but was unable to sustain the level of play that had given him the lead. Bazil Hughes was able to win the first game 21-20 after saving 5 game points (no deuce was played during this tournament), and then won the second game comfortably to secure the title.

With this win, Bazil Hughes became the 2nd player (after Liam Campbell in 2010) to have been confirmed to go through the Men's Singles tournament without dropping a single game. However this feat may have occurred multiple times pre-2009 - no accurate records of the individual matches played exist.

This tournament used an atypical format in which there was a group stage, a knockout round, a further group stage (with 2 groups of 3 players), and then semi-finals and the final.Women's SinglesIndy Priestman defeated Anne Larische to win an unprecedented 10th World Championship title.DoublesIn 2013 there was no Mixed Doubles tournament, but Men's Doubles and Women's Doubles tournaments, in which pairs were chosen by the participants before the tournament began. The Men's Doubles champions were Phillip Bahner & David Sobiella. The Women's Doubles champions were Indy Priestman & Chloe Bruce.

2012

The 2013 World Tambourelli Championship, hosted by the Devon Tambourelli Association, took place on the 20th and 21 July on Riverford Farm near Totnes in Devon.

The Men's Singles was won by Malcolm Heyes. The Women's Singles was won by Indy Priestman.Men's SinglesMalcolm Heyes defeated Seth Priestman in 2 games in the Men's Singles final.Women's SinglesIndy Priestman defeated Jasmine Bosenick to win her 9th World Championship title.Mixed DoublesMalcolm Heyes & Tom Amey won the Mixed Doubles tournament, defeating Evan Barretxeguren-Priestman & Seth Priestman in the final.

2011

The 2011 World Tambourelli Championship, hosted by the Devon Tambourelli Association, took place on the 23rd and 24 July on Riverford Farm near Totnes in Devon.

The Men's Singles was won by Bazil Hughes. The Women's Singles was won by Stacey Duff. The Doubles was won by Ezra Cohen & Seth PriestmanMen's SinglesBazil Hughes defeated the defending champion Liam Campbell in the semi-finals and tambourelli's most-decorated champion Malcolm Heyes in the final to win his first World Championship title. The tournament featured an all-Scottish last 4, and also had a Scottish winner in the Women's Singles tournament, solidifying the return-to-supremacy of Scottish tambourelli.Women's SinglesStacey Duff defeated Dilushi Jayasingha in the final to win her first World Championship title. At 17 years of age, she was the youngest Women's Singles champion in tambourelli history.Mixed DoublesEzra Cohen & Seth Priestman won the Mixed Doubles tournament, defeating Johnny Tillbrook & Malcolm Heyes in the final.

2010

The 2010 World Tambourelli Championship, hosted by Scottish Tambourelli, took place on Saturday the 31st of July and Sunday the 1st of August in the Merrick Leisure Centre in Newton Stewart.

The Men's Singles was won by Liam Campbell. The Women's Singles was won by Indy Priestman. The Doubles was won by Jack Higginson and Saul WoollacottMen's SinglesLiam Campbell, who was reigning under-16s World Champion and had only just turned 16, produced perhaps the most dominant Men's Singles tournament in tambourelli history to take the World Championship title in his first attempt. Not only did he win every game in the tournament - a first since verified records began - he did so in spectacularly dominant fashion. In the 14 individual games he played (8 during the knockout stages and 6 in the group stages), he limited his opponent to 13 points or fewer in all but 1 game (all games to 21). So not only did he win every game he played, but he was only in any danger of losing once - a 21-19 victory over Bazil Hughes in the Round of 16, which he followed with a swift 21-11 win in game 2.

With this win Liam Campbell became the youngest ever Men's Singles champion, the most dominant ever Men's Singles champion, and the only player to win the tournament in their very first attempt (excluding the first tournament ever held). He also brought Scottish tambourelli back to prominence, not only by ending a run of 3 consecutive English champions but also by emphatically dispatching Ezra Cohen, who was playing in his 4th consecutive final, by a scoreline of 21-12, 21-13.Women's SinglesIndy Priestman defeated Stacey Duff in the final to win her 8th World Tambourelli championship title.Mixed DoublesJack Higginson & Saul Woollacott won the Mixed Doubles tournament, defeating Andy Priestman & Bazil Hughes in the final.

 Other Tournaments 

 The German Open - Dresden 

2018

The 9th German Open, hosted by Tamburello Dresden, took place on Saturday the 22nd and Sunday the 23rd of September 2018 in Dresden, Germany.

The Men's Singles was won by Alexander Christen. The Women's Singles was won by Inga Höben. The Men's Doubles was won by Taliesin Appleton-Wickens & Bazil Hughes. The Women's Doubles was won by Nadine Harmatschek & Laura Stolzer. The Mixed Doubles was won by Nadine Harmatschek & Dominic Hauke.Men's Singles2017

The 9th German Open, hosted by Tamburello Dresden, took place on Saturday the 23rd and Sunday the 24th of September 2017 in Dresden, Germany.

The Men's Singles was won by Alexander Christen. The Women's Singles was won by Inga Höben. The Men's Doubles was won by Taliesin Appleton-Wickens & Bazil Hughes. The Mixed Doubles was won by Alexander Christen & Gabriele Rose.Men's SinglesWomen's Singles'''

External links 
 BBC News video
 Scottish Tambourelli blog
 Tambourelli Rules - Tam Japan
 Men's Singles 2011 WTC Final video
 Trickshot winner video - Dresden 2012
 Tambourelli on Reddit
 Dresden Club website
 Kleinnaundorf Club website
 TamJapan Club website
 Tamsports UK website
 German Tambourelli Wikipedia article

References 

1970s establishments in Scotland
Team sports
Ball games
Sports originating in Scotland